The  is a square-shaped (hōfun (方墳)) Kofun period burial mound located in what is now the Sōja neighborhood of the city of Maebashi, Gunma Prefecture in the northern Kantō region of Japan. The site was designated a National Historic Site of Japan in 1974.

Overview
The Jaketsuzan Kofun is located in the northwestern part of the city, about 600 meters to the west of Otobashi Bridge over the Tone River. It is located in an area with a heavy concentration of kofun burial mounds.

Overall length: 39 meters
Overall Width: 39 meters
Height: 5 meters

The tumulus is built as a step pyramid in two tiers and there is a trace of a 12 meter wide double moat. Neither fukiishi nor haniwa have been found. The burial chamber is a stone-lined chamber with a depth of thee meters and width of 2.6 meters and height of 1.8 meters. It contains a sandstone block which may have been a stand for the sarcophagus. The ceiling, back wall and side sides are each made with a single monolithic andesite boulders which are slightly water polished. The entrance stone is carved to resemble gate pillars. There are also traces of a plaster coating on the inside of the chamber. The burial chamber has stood open since ancient times, so no grave goods have been found.

The tumulus is believed to have been one of the last built in this area, from the end of the 7th century to the beginning of the 8th century. It is located near the Sannō temple ruins, the Kōzuke Kokubun-ji and the provincial capital of Kōzuke Province.

The tumulus is located approximately a 20-minute walk from Sōja Station on the JR East Jōetsu Line.

See also
List of Historic Sites of Japan (Gunma)

References

External links
Maebashi City official site 
Gunma Prefectural Site 

Kofun
History of Gunma Prefecture
Maebashi
Archaeological sites in Japan
Historic Sites of Japan